Montes Llanos (also spelled Monte Llano), is one of the 31 barrios in the municipality of Ponce, Puerto Rico. Along with Magueyes, Tibes, Portugués, Maragüez, Machuelo Arriba, and Cerrillos, Montes Llanos is one of the municipality's seven rural interior barrios. It was created in 1898.

Location

Montes Llanos is a mountainous rural barrio located in the central portion of the municipality, north of the city of Ponce, at latitude 18.118717 N, and longitude -66.139594 W. The toponymy, or origin of the name, is related to the old "Hato Llano" barrio. The name Montes Llanos relates to the term monte, which in Spanish describes a natural but significant elevation of the surface of the land that is covered with trees, shrubs or other vegetation.

Boundaries
Montes Llanos is bounded on the North by PR-505 (roughly), on the South by the hills north of Pastillo Road and El Cedro I Road, on the West by the hills west of Río Chiquito, and on the East by the hills west of Río Bayagan and PR-505 (roughly).

In terms of barrio-to-barrio boundaries, Montes Llanos is bounded in the North by Barrios San Patricio and Maragüez, in the South by Portugués and Machuelo Arriba, in the West by Tibes, and in the East by Barrio Maragüez.

Demographics
Montes Llanos has  of land area and no water area.  In 2000, the population of Montes Llanos was 462 persons, and it had a density of 215 persons per square mile, making it the least populated barrio in the municipality. Montes Llanos is the least populated, though not the least densely populated, barrio in the municipality of Ponce.  The community of Villas del Monte Verde is located in Montes Llanos.

In 2010, the population of Monte Llano was 523 persons, and it had a density of 243.3 persons per square mile.

Geography
The highest point in barrio Montes Llanos stands at 2,394 feet and is located in the extreme northwest tip of the barrio.

Infrastructure
The main road serving Barrio Montes Llanos is PR-505.

Notable Landmarks
Barrio Montes Llanos is home to the origin of the Río Chiquito. Rio Chiquito feeds into Rio Portugues just as they both enter the Ponce city limits to eventually empty as Rio Bucana into the Caribbean Sea opposite Caja de Muertos.

See also

 List of communities in Puerto Rico

References

External links

Barrio Montes Llanos
1898 establishments in Puerto Rico